Acacia oshanesii, commonly known as corkwood wattle and irish wattle, is a species of Acacia native to eastern Australia.

Description
The angled to terete branchlets have fine yellowish brown to white hairs found on the ridges. It flowers throughout the year and produces yellow flowers. The simple inflorescences are located in the axillary racemes and have spherical-flower-heads that contain 12 to 25 pale yellow or cream-coloured flowers.

Distribution
It is found in parts of north eastern New South Wales from around Bellingen and Coff Harbour in the south extending northward into south eastern Queensland. It is found in a variety of habitat growing in gravelly, clay and sandy to loamy soils as a part of wet sclerophyll forest and rainforest communities. Its range extends from around Maryborough in the north down to around Stanmore in the south where it is situated in coastal areas with a high rainfall and low altitudes.

See also
 List of Acacia species

References

oshanesii
Fabales of Australia
Flora of New South Wales
Flora of Queensland